Şanlıurfa BSK is a sports club located in Şanlıurfa, Turkey. The football club plays in the Şanlıurfa 2. Amatör Ligi.

Sport in Şanlıurfa
Football clubs in Turkey